Ek Hasina Thi may refer to:

Ek Hasina Thi (song), a Hindi song from the film Karz''
Ek Hasina Thi (film), a 2004 noir film from India
Ek Hasina Thi (TV series), a 2014 television series from India